Chuí Lighthouse is an active lighthouse in Barra do Chuí, at the mouth of Chuí Stream, just  from the Uruguayan border; the lighthouse is the southernmost of all the Brazilian lights.

History
Chuí Lighthouse is the last of four lights scattered along  of dangerous coast from Rio Grande to Barra do Chuí. The first lighthouse, lit on 24 May 1910, was a red metal skeletal tower, built under the supervision of Alfred Kurt Schultze. In 1934 the skeletal tower was in poor conditions due to the corrosion, it was decided to build a new concrete tower, but some years later it was abandoned because of the instability of the foundation. The lighthouse is managed by Brazilian Navy and is identified by the country code number BR-4660.

See also
 List of lighthouses in Brazil

References

External links

  Centro de Sinalização Náutica Almirante Moraes Rego

Lighthouses in Brazil